Guilherme Catramby Filho (born 2 May 1905, date of death unknown) was a Brazilian modern pentathlete. He competed at the 1936 Summer Olympics.

References

1905 births
Year of death missing
Brazilian male modern pentathletes
Olympic modern pentathletes of Brazil
Modern pentathletes at the 1936 Summer Olympics
20th-century Brazilian people